Jacob J. Schwartzwald (March 12, 1900 – October 8, 1983) was an American lawyer and politician from New York.

Life
He was born on March 12, 1900, in Williamsburg, Brooklyn. He graduated from Brooklyn Law School, and practiced law in New York City.

Schwartzwald was a member of the New York State Assembly (Kings Co., 6th D.) in 1927, 1928, 1929, 1930, 1931, 1932 and 1933.

He was a member of the New York State Senate (7th D.) from 1935 to 1942, sitting in the 158th, 159th, 160th, 161st, 162nd and 163rd New York State Legislatures.

On September 9, 1942, he was appointed by Gov. Herbert H. Lehman to the City Court, to fill the vacancy caused by the death of Edward J. Kelly. In November 1942, he was elected to a full ten-year term, and was re-elected in November 1952.

On November 2, 1954, he was elected to the New York Supreme Court for a 14-year term beginning on January 1, 1955. On November 20, 1954, six weeks before his term would begin, he was appointed by Gov. Thomas E. Dewey to the Supreme Court, to fill a vacancy. He was re-elected in November 1968, became an Official Referee (i.e. a senior judge on an additional seat) of the Supreme Court in 1971, and retired from the bench at the end of 1976 when he reached the constitutional age limit.

He died on October 8, 1983, in Interfaith Hospital in Brooklyn.

Sources

1900 births
1983 deaths
Democratic Party New York (state) state senators
Politicians from Brooklyn
Democratic Party members of the New York State Assembly
New York Supreme Court Justices
Brooklyn Law School alumni
20th-century American judges
20th-century American politicians